Wuxi is a city in southern Jiangsu province, eastern China,  by car to the northwest of downtown Shanghai, between Changzhou and Suzhou.  At end of 2021, the population of Wuxi was 7.48 million. By the end of 2022, the registered population of the entire city of Wuxi was 5.1901 million, with a per capita GDP ranking first in the country. 

Wuxi is a prominent historical and cultural city of China, and has been a thriving economic center since ancient times as a production as an export hub of rice, silk and textiles. In the last few decades it has emerged as a major producer of electrical motors, software, solar technology and bicycle parts. The city lies in the southern delta of the Yangtze River and on Lake Tai, which with its 48 islets is popular with tourists. Notable landmarks include Lihu Park, the Mt. Lingshan Grand Buddha Scenic Area and its -tall Grand Buddha at Ling Shan statue, Xihui Park, Wuxi Zoo and Taihu Lake Amusement Park and the Wuxi Museum.

The city is served by Sunan Shuofang International Airport, which opened in 2004, the Wuxi Metro, opened in 2014, and the Shanghai–Nanjing Intercity High-Speed Railway and Beijing–Shanghai high-speed railway which connect it to Shanghai.

Wuxi is also a major city among the top 500 cities in the world by scientific research outputs, as tracked by the Nature Index and home to Jiangnan University, the only key national university of “Project 211” in the city. Wuxi also now possesses the highest GDP per capita of any city in China.

Etymology
Wuxi literally means "no tin." The name "with tin" was once adopted during the short-lived Xin Dynasty.

It was told that the Qin general Wang Jian named the region "Wuxi" during his conquest of the state of Chu (225-223 BCE). When Wang Jian's troops reached a mountain, they discovered a stone stele engraved with a message: "With tin, wars occur. Without tin, wars are gone." The local inhabitants later explained that the mountain was named "Xishan", literally "Mountain of Tin", due to the large amount of tin and lead once mined there; in the period before Wang's conquest, however, these metal ores seemed to have been exhausted. Meanwhile, the author of the discovered stele was unknown. Wang Jian then decided to name the area as "Wuxi" and commented that:

This stele is exposed now, which means peace is finally come. Probably, people from long ago predicted this event and created this stele to warn their descendants! This place should be named as "Wuxi" (without tin) from now on..

Despite varied origin stories, many modern Chinese scholars favor the view that the word is derived from the "old Yue language" or, supposedly, the old Kra–Dai languages, rather than reflecting the presence of tin in the area.

History
The history of Wuxi can be traced back to Shang dynasty (1600–1046 BC).
The tin industry thrived in the area in ancient times but it was eventually depleted, so that when Wuxi was established in 202 BCE during the Han dynasty, it was named "Wuxi" (Without Tin). Administratively, Wuxi became a district of Biling (later Changzhou) and only during the Yuan dynasty (1206–1368) did it become an independent prefecture. Wuxi and Changzhou are considered to be the birthplaces of modern industrialization in China.

Agriculture and the silk industry flourished in Wuxi and the town became a transportation hub under the early Tang Dynasty after the opening of the Grand Canal in 609. It became known as one of the biggest markets for rice in China.

The Donglin Academy, originally founded during the Song dynasty (960-1279) was restored in Wuxi in 1604. Not a school, it served as a public forum, advocating a Confucian orthodoxy and ethics. Many of its academicians were retired court officials or officials deposed in the 1590s due to factionalism.

As a populous county, its eastern part was separated and made into Jinkui county in 1724. Both Wuxi and Jinkui were utterly devastated by the Taiping Rebellion, which resulted in nearly 2/3 of their population being killed. The number of “able-bodied males” (ding) were only 72,053 and 138,008 individuals in 1865, versus 339,549 and 258,934 in 1830.

During the Qing dynasty (1636–1912), cotton and silk production flourished in Wuxi. Trade increased with the opening of ports to Shanghai in 1842,  and Zhenjiang and Nanjing in 1858.  Wuxi became a center of the textile industry in China. Textile mills were built in 1894 and silk reeling establishments known as "filatures" were built in 1904. Wuxi was remained the regional center for the waterborne transport of grain. The opening of the railways to Shanghai and to the cities of Zhenjiang and Nanjing to the northwest in 1908 further increased the exports of rice from the area. Jinkui xian merged into Wuxi County with the onset of the Republic in 1912.
Many agricultural laborers and merchants moved to Shanghai in the late 19th century and early 20th century; some prospered in the new factories.

After World War II, Wuxi's importance as an economic center diminished, but it remains a regional manufacturing hub. Tourism has increasingly become important. On April 23, 1949, Wuxi was divided into Wuxi City and Wuxi County, and it became a provincial city in 1953 when Jiangsu Province was founded. In March 1995, several administrative changes were made within Wuxi City and Wuxi County to accommodate for Wuxi New District, with the creation of 19 administrative villages such as Shuofang, Fangqian, Xin’an and Meicun. Jiangnan University was originally founded in 1902, before merging with two other colleges in 2001 to form the modern university.

Geography

Climate

Administrative divisions 

The prefecture-level city of Wuxi administers seven county-level divisions, including 5 districts and 2 county-level cities. The information here presented uses the metric system and data from 2010 Census.

These districts are sub-divided into 73 township-level divisions, including 59 towns and 24 subdistricts.

Economy

Wuxi is a regional business hub, with extensive manufacturing and large industrial parks devoted to new industries. Historically a center of textile manufacturing,  the city has adopted new industries such as electric motor manufacturing, MRP software development, bicycle and brake manufacturing, and solar technology, with two major photovoltaic companies, Suntech Power and Jetion Holdings Ltd, based in Wuxi. Wuxi Pharma Tech, a major pharmaceutical company, is based in Wuxi The city has a rapidly developing skyline with the opening of three supertall skyscrapers in 2014: Wuxi IFS, Wuxi Suning Plaza 1 and Wuxi Maoye City - Marriott Hotel.

In 2013, it had a GDP of 121.3 billion yuan ($19.54 billion), and an industrial output value of 276.7 billion yuan, accounting for 15% of production in the Wuxi area.
The district includes the Wuxi Hi-tech Industrial Development Zone, Wuxi (Taihu) International Technology Park, Wuxi Airport Industrial Park, China (Wuxi) Industrial Expo Park, China Wu Culture Expo Park, and International Education and Living Community.

Hotels in Wuxi include Wuxi Maoye City – Marriott Hotel, Hilton Hotel's Wuxi-Lingshan Double Tree Resort near the Lingshan Giant Buddha, Kempinski Hotel Wuxi, Landison Square Hotel Wuxi, noted for its Wu jade phoenix sculpture in the lobby, Radisson Blu Resort Wetland Park Wuxi, Sheraton Wuxi Binhu Hotel, the Wuxi Grand Hotel, and Wuxi Hubin Hotel.

Culture and education
Wuxi is one of the major art and cultural centers of Jiangnan. The city is known for its Huishan clay figurines, which take their name from the black clay of Huishan Mountain. The figurines have been produced for over 400 years since the Ming dynasty, and are typically large-headed dolls, puppies, kittens and chickens. The figurines are believed to promote longevity and exorcise evil spirits. Yixing clay teapots are also of note, made from purple, red and green earth, which is said to enhance the tea drinking experience.

The city is served by Jiangnan University, a key national university of “Project 211” and center for scientific research, which was originally founded in 1902 and established in 1958 as the Wuxi Institute of Light Industry. In 2001 it was reconstituted by the Ministry of Education with the merger of two other colleges to formally establish Jiangnan University. The Taihu University of Wuxi, beside Huishan National Forest Park is a private university and one of the largest in China, covering over 2,000 acres with over 20,000 teachers and students and more than 20 different faculties.

Other educational institutes include the Wuxi Institute of Technology.

Landmarks

The city lies in the southern Yangtze River delta on Lake Tai, which is the third largest freshwater lake in China, and a rich resource for tourism in the area with cruises. There are 72 peninsulas and peaks and 48 islets, including Yuantouzhu (the Islet of Turtlehead) and Taihu Xiandao (Islands of the Deities).

Parks and gardens

Wuxi has many private gardens or parks built by learned scholars and illustrious people in the past. Lihu Park in Binhu District was built in 1927 and named after the politician and economist Fan Li. The Star of Taihu Lake is noted for its water Ferris wheel. The gardens contains a long embankment with willow trees and a path beside the lake with numerous small bridges and pavilions. On the southwest bank of the lake at the foot of Junzhang Hill is Changguangxi Wetland Park, a  stretch of canal connecting Lihu Lake to the north and Taihu Lake to the south. It contains the Shitang Bridge and a lotus pond. Also in Binhu District is Wuxi Zoo and Taihu Lake Amusement Park, an AAAA national landmark with over a 1000 animals including Asian elephant, leopard, chimpanzee, giant panda and white rhinoceros and an ecology and science exhibition and recreation area.

The Mt Lingshan area also contains the Brahma Palace, Xiangfu Temple, Five Mudra Mandala, Nine Dragons Bathing Sakyamuni (a  statue of Sakyamuni), and numerous other Buddhist sites. Xihui Park, established in 1958 at the foot of Xi Shan to the west of the city, contains Jichang Garden  and the Dragon Light Pagoda.

Museums
Wuxi Museum was formally opened on October 1, 2008 following a merger of the Wuxi Revolution Museum, Wuxi Museum and Wuxi Science Museum. The museum also administers the Chinese National Industry and Commerce Museum of Wuxi, Chengji Art Museum, Zhou Huaimin Painting Museum, Zhang Wentian Former Residence and Wuxi Ancient Stone Inscriptions Museum. Wuxi Art Museum, known as the Wuxi Painting and Calligraphy Institute before the rename in 2011, was established on December 7, 1979 in Chong’an district. Hongshan Archaeological Museum in Wuxi New District opened in 2008 and houses artifacts related to the local Wu culture between 770 and 221 BC. The items, which include miniature jade engravings and objects related to burial and musical customs, were unearthed at Hongshan Tomb Complex in 2004.

The Former Residence of Xue Fucheng at No. 152 Xueqian Street in Chong'an district, is the former home of Zue Fencheng, a noted diplomat of the late Qing dynasty and is open to the public.

Sports
Wuxi Sports Center opened in October 1994 and has a capacity of 30,000. It hosts the Wuxi Classic, a snooker event which attracted the biggest names in snooker. Wuxi City Sports Park Stadium hosted the 2017 ITTF Asian-Championships (Ping Pong), and the 2019 World Cup in snooker in June 2019. Major League Baseball based its main Chinese recruitment center in Wuxi since 2009 in Wuxi Development Center at Dongbeitang High School. There Major League Baseball scouts recruit the best players in China in the hopes that they will eventually play professional baseball in America.

Transport
Wuxi is situated on the Shanghai–Nanjing Intercity High-Speed Railway, a  railway which opened on July 1, 2010, linking it directly with
the provincial capital of Nanjing, Shanghai and Suzhou.

Wuxi lies along China National Highway 312 which connects Shanghai to central and northwestern China. The  Shanghai-Nanjing Expressway (G42), which opened in November 1996, connecting it to Shanghai, Suzhou, Changzhou, Zhenjiang and other cities in Jiangsu province. The  Wuxi-Yixing Expressway connects Wuxi with Yixing within the regional prefecture-level area.

Notable people 
 An Guo, printer and collecter of antiques (1481–1534)
 Ni Zan, painter (1301–1374)
 Xue Fucheng, diplomat (1838–1894)
 Gu Deng, mathematician and politician (1882–1947?)
 Chen Chi (1912—2005), painter
 Hua Yanjun (1893–1950), musician
 Liu Tianhua, folk musician (1895–1932)
 Zhou Peiyuan, (1902–1993) theoretical physicist
 Zhang Xu, telecommunications engineer (1913–2015)
 Zou Jiayi, (b. 1963), politician and economist
 Qian Zhongshu, 20th century Chinese literary scholar and writer (1910–1998)
 Qian Weichang, physicist, applied mathematician and academician of the Chinese Academy of Sciences (1910–1998)

Sister cities 

  Akashi, Hyōgo, Japan, friendship city since 1981
  Gimhae, Gyeongsangnam-do, South Korea
 Hamilton, New Zealand

See also

 China Wu Culture Expo Park
 Jiangnan
 List of cities in the People's Republic of China by population
 List of twin towns and sister cities in China

References

External links

 Government website of Wuxi 
 Wuxi at China Daily

 
Cities in Jiangsu
Yangtze River Delta

Prefecture-level divisions of Jiangsu
Jiangnan